Larry Jordan (born 1962) is an American businessman, basketball executive and former professional basketball player. He played college basketball for North Carolina A&T State University before playing professionally in the World Basketball League. He is the older brother of former basketball player Michael Jordan.

Playing career
Noted for his vertical leap, he was drafted in the third round of the 1987 World Basketball League draft by the Chicago Express. He helped the team to a 27-27 record. In the playoffs, it reached the WBL finals where it lost to the Las Vegas Silver Streaks, 102-95.

Executive career
In 2011, Jordan joined the staff of the Charlotte Bobcats. In July 2013, he was promoted to team director of player personnel. In 2021, Jordan was promoted to Vice President of Player Personnel.

Personal life
Jordan is the third of five children, the son of Deloris (née Peoples) and James R. Jordan Sr. He has two brothers, James R. Jordan Jr. and Michael Jordan, and two sisters, Deloris and Roslyn. James retired in 2006 as the command sergeant major of the 35th Signal Brigade of the XVIII Airborne Corps in the U.S. Army. His son, Justin Jordan, played NCAA Division I basketball for the UNC Greensboro Spartans and is a scout for the Charlotte Hornets.

References

1962 births
Living people
American businesspeople in retailing
American men's basketball players
Basketball players from North Carolina
Businesspeople from North Carolina
Charlotte Hornets executives
Shooting guards